Leader Heights is an unincorporated community in York Township, York County, Pennsylvania, United States.

References

Unincorporated communities in York County, Pennsylvania
Unincorporated communities in Pennsylvania